Damien Patton (born July 11, 1972) is known for being a founder of the American software company Banjo and as a NASCAR mechanic. He is a former member of the Ku Klux Klan. After Patton's links to the KKK were discovered, in 2020, Banjo had several contracts suspended. He also resigned as CEO in May of that year. He is a Navy veteran.

Biography

Early life 
Patton was born July 11, 1972.

Patton says he lived under the freeway in Los Angeles from age fifteen on. He shaved his head and affiliated with white supremacist Skinheads. Texas KKK member Jesse Albert Johnson took him to Tennessee; Johnson wanted to move the James O. Pace organization there and open a chapter of the Ku Klux Klan.

Patton has confirmed his membership in the KKK, Aryan Nations, and involvement with the white power skinheads, which he called "the foot soldiers for groups like the Ku Klux Klan and the Aryan Nations", and admitted to painting swastikas and "KKK" on buildings, as well as impersonating an FBI agent. OneZero republished a picture printed in The Tennessean of Patton at an Aryan Nations meeting where he and other members are giving the Nazi salute. He also built a house for Christian music producer Jonathan David Brown, and worked as a "maintenance man" at an apartment complex, where he purchased weapons for Brown.

After attending an Aryan Nations meeting with Brown.

In June 1990, when Patton was seventeen, he was involved in a drive-by shooting of a synagogue as a member of the Ku Klux Klan. He drove Grand Knight Leonard William Armstrong during a drive-by shooting with a TEC-9 on the West End Synagogue. Police arrested Patton and confiscated an AK-47. He was then released and shortly fled the state. In November, he returned to Tennessee.

Navy, construction industry and NASCAR 
Patton joined the U.S. Navy in February 1991. In a 2015 Inc. profile, he said he wanted to enlist after seeing the 1990 Gulf War on TV. He said he rose up the ranks on the aircraft carrier Kitty Hawk, leaving after two tours, ending up in San Diego, California. By 1992, he was on the aircraft carrier USS America (CV-66).

He admitted to fraternizing with Skinheads in the Navy during Brown's 1992 trial over the KKK shooting. In the trial he indicated he pled guilty to a juvenile offence in exchange for providing testimony.

Patton said he had a "building and construction company I started as a kid", and sold it when in his mid-20s.

After starting on a NASCAR pit crew in 1993, he became the chief mechanic on a NASCAR team sponsored by Lowe's. His NASCAR career lasted eight years. Patton told Inc. that he got his degree from University of North Carolina at Greensboro's Bryant School of Business in three years while working for NASCAR, graduating magna cum laude.

He then was a crime scene investigator for Davidson, North Carolina Police Department while still working full-time.

Later a profile said he moved to Hawaii and got into wood flooring, including manufacturing, selling it in 2006.

By 2009 Patton was taking graduate classes at MIT, commuting from Las Vegas to Boston.

Banjo

After hackathons in 2010 and 2011, Patton founded Banjo, then called Peer Compass, as a localized friend-finding app. By 2014 Banjo had pivoted to AI event detection of surveillance video for public safety, gaining a $20 million contract for the State of Utah in 2019 and attention from privacy advocates. When Patton's ties to the KKK were uncovered in April 2020, the company experienced significant negative publicity, and their government contracts with Utah and Indiana were suspended.

In April 2020, Matt Stroud of OneZero uncovered CEO Patton's involvement with the Nashville, Tennessee-based Dixie Knights chapter of the Ku Klux Klan.

On May 8, 2020, Patton resigned from the board and as CEO of Banjo, removing all his decision making authority.

Personal life and interests 
Patton was married to Lin Baddestelli and had one child - at the time of his grand jury testimony in September 1991.

By 2015, Patton was married to Jennifer Peck, who worked at Banjo.

References

External links
Patton's blog from 2008

Living people
American technology company founders
NASCAR
1972 births